Han Jeong-mi (also known as Han Jung-mi, born 5 June 1968) is a South Korean sailor. She competed in the women's 470 event at the 1988 Summer Olympics.

References

External links
 
 

1968 births
Living people
South Korean female sailors (sport)
Olympic sailors of South Korea
Sailors at the 1988 Summer Olympics – 470
Place of birth missing (living people)